Marcella is a novel by Mary Augusta Ward, first published in 1894.

Further reading

 "Marcella: Mrs. Humphry Ward's New Novel on Socialism and Wealth," Review of Reviews, Vol. 9, 1894, pp. 492–493.
 "Marcella and Pembroke," The Atlantic Monthly, Vol. 74, No. 442, 1894, pp. 272–74.
 "Mrs. Ward’s Marcella," Overland Monthly and Out West Magazine, Vol. 24, No. 142, 1894, pp. 446–447. 
 "The Marcellas and Mintas of Society," The Congregationalist, Vol. 80, No. 10, March 1895, p. 361. 
 Barry, W.F. (1894). "The Strike of a Sex," The Quarterly Review, Vol. 179, No. 358, pp. 289–318. 
 Crawford, F. Marion (May 1894). "Marcella: Mrs. Humphry Ward’s New Novel," Current Literature, Vol. 15, No. 5, p. 396.
 Herrero Granado, M. Dolores (1995). "Defiance in Disguise: Mary Ward’s Ambivalent Concept of Women as Reflected in Marcella," English Literature in Transition, 1880-1920, Vol. 38, No. 4, pp. 445–465.
 Johnson, Lionel P. (1921). "Marcella." In: Reviews and Critical Papers. Ed. Robert Shafer. London: Elkin Mathews, pp. 58–65.
 Rowland-Brown, Lilian (1920). "Heroines of Mrs Humphry Ward," The Fortnightly Review, Vol. 113, pp. 886–896.
 Rives, Françoise (1980). "The Marcellas, Lauras, Dianas... of Mrs Humphrey Ward," Caliban, Vol. 17, pp. 69–79.
 Shand, A. Innes (1894). "Marcella," The Edinburgh Review, Vol. 180, no. 369, pp. 108–130.
 Smalley, George W. (1895). "Mrs. Humphry Ward." In: Studies of Men. London: Macmillan and Co., pp. 226–236.
 Van Ness, Mary Wickliffe (1898). "Mrs. Humphry Ward's Marcella." In: Matthew Arnold and the Spirit of the Age. New York: Knickerbocker Press, pp. 123–128.

External links
 Marcella, at Project Gutenberg
 Marcella, at Hathi Trust
 Marcella, Vol. I Vol. II, Vol. III, at Internet Archive
 The Marcella Web Page
 

Victorian novels
1894 British novels
English philosophical novels
Novels by Mary Augusta Ward